Suicide intervention is a direct effort to prevent a person or persons from attempting to take their own life or lives intentionally.

Asking direct questions is a recommended first step in intervention.  These questions may include asking about whether a person is having thoughts of suicide, if they have thought about how they would do it, if they have access to the means to carry out their plan, and if they have a timeframe in mind.   Asking these questions builds connection, a key protective factor in preventing against suicide.  These questions also enable all parties to establish a better understanding of risk.  Research shows that asking direct questions about suicide does not increase suicidal ideation, and may decrease it.

Most countries have some form of mental health legislation which allows people expressing suicidal thoughts or intent to be detained involuntarily for psychiatric treatment when their judgment is deemed to be impaired.  These laws may grant the courts, police, or a medical doctor the power to order an individual to be apprehended to hospital for treatment.  This is sometimes referred to as being "committed". The review of ongoing involuntary treatment may be conducted by the hospital, the courts, or a quasi-judicial body, depending on the jurisdiction. Legislation normally requires police or court authorities to bring the individual to a hospital for treatment as soon as practical and not hold them in locations such as a police station.

Mental health professionals and some other health professionals receive training in assessment and treatment of suicidality. Suicide hotlines are widely available for people seeking help. However, some people may be reluctant to discuss their suicidal thoughts, due to stigma, previous negative experiences, fear of said detainment, or other reasons.

First aid for suicidal ideation 

There are a number of myths about suicide.  It is not usually unpredictable; in 75-80% of cases, the suicidal person has given some sort of warning sign.  A key myth to dispel is that talking to someone about suicide increases the risk of suicide.  This is simply not true. Someone expressing suicidal thoughts should be encouraged to seek mental health treatment.  Friends and family can provide supportive listening, empathy, and encouragement to develop a safety plan.  Serious warning signs of imminent suicidal risk include  the intent to commit suicide and a specific plan with access to lethal means.  If a person expresses these warning signs, emergency services should be contacted immediately. It is important that the person feel they are taken seriously. Another myth is if someone is speaking of committing suicide, that they are merely seeking attention.

Safety plans can include sources of support, self-soothing activities, reasons for living (such as commitment to family, pets, etc.), and safe people to call and places to go.  When a person is feeling acutely distressed and overwhelmed by suicidal thoughts, it can be helpful to refer back to the safety plan or call a suicide helpline if the safety plan can not be done at that moment

Mental health treatment 

Comprehensive approaches to suicidality include stabilization and safety, assessment of risk factors, and ongoing management and problem-solving around minimizing risk factors and bolstering protective factors.  During the acute phase, admission to a psychiatric ward or involuntary commitment may be used in an attempt to ensure client safety, but the least restrictive means possible should be used.  Treatment focuses on reducing suffering and enhancing coping skills, and involves treatment of any underlying illness.

DSM-5 axis I disorders, particularly major depressive disorder, and axis II disorders, particularly borderline personality disorder, increase the risk of suicide.  Individuals with co-occurring mental illness and substance use disorders are at increased risk compared to individuals with just one of the two disorders.  While antidepressants may not directly decrease suicide risk in adults, they are in many cases effective at treating major depressive disorder, and as such are recommended for patients with depression.  There is evidence that long-term lithium therapy reduces suicide in individuals with bipolar disorder or major depressive disorder.  Electroconvulsive therapy (ECT), or shock therapy, rapidly decreases suicidal thinking. The choice of treatment approach is made based on the patient's presenting symptoms and history.  In cases where a patient is actively attempting suicide even while on a hospital ward, a fast-acting treatment such as ECT may be first-line.

Ideally, families are involved in the ongoing support of the suicidal individual, and they can help to strengthen protective factors and problem-solve around risk factors.  Both families and the suicidal person should be supported by health care providers to cope with the societal stigma surrounding mental illness and suicide.

Attention should also be given to the suicidal person's cultural background, as this can aid in understanding protective factors and problem-solving approaches.  Risk factors may also arise related to membership in an oppressed minority group.  Aboriginal people may benefit from traditional Aboriginal healing techniques that facilitate a change in thinking, connection with tradition, and emotional expression.

Psychotherapy, particularly cognitive behavioural therapy, is an important component in the management of suicide risk.  According to a 2005 randomized controlled trial by Gregory Brown, Aaron Beck and others, cognitive therapy can reduce repeat suicide attempts by 50%.

Suicide prevention 

Various suicide prevention strategies have been suggested by mental-health professionals:
 Promoting mental resilience through optimism and connectedness.
 Education about suicide, including risk factors, warning signs, and the availability of help.
 Increasing the proficiency of health and welfare services in responding to people in need. This includes better training for health professionals and employing crisis-counseling organizations.
 Reducing domestic violence, substance abuse, and divorce are long-term strategies to reduce many mental health problems.
 Reducing access to convenient means of suicide (e.g., toxic substances, handguns, ropes/shoelaces).
 Reducing the quantity of dosages supplied in packages of non-prescription medicines e.g., aspirin.
 Interventions targeted at high-risk groups.

Research
Research into suicide is published across a wide spectrum of journals dedicated to the biological, economic, psychological, medical, and social sciences. In addition to those, a few journals are exclusively devoted to the study of suicide (suicidology), most notably, Crisis, Suicide and Life Threatening Behavior, and the Archives of Suicide Research.

References

 Debski, J., Spadafore, C., Jacob, S., Poole, D. A., & Hixson, M. D. (2007). Suicide intervention: Training, roles, and knowledge of school psychologists. Psychology in the Schools, 44(2), 157–170. 
 Granello, D. (2010). A Suicide Crisis Intervention Model with 25 Practical Strategies for Implementation. Journal of Mental Health Counseling, 32(3), 218–235. Retrieved from EBSCOhost
  Retrieved from EBSCOhost

External links
 Stamp Out Suicide Promoting suicide awareness and supporting suicide prevention
 Suicide Prevention Help A portal for texts, hot-lines, and other websites designed for the person at risk and care-provider of suicidal crises.
 National Suicide Prevention Lifeline
 National (U.S) Suicide Prevention Hot-lines provides telephone numbers for access to crisis intervention counselors, and brief helping texts for people in crisis situations
 It Gets Better Project The It Gets Better Project was created to show young LGBT people the levels of happiness, potential, and positivity their lives will reach – if they can just get through their teen years. The It Gets Better Project wants to remind teenagers in the LGBT community that they are not alone — and it WILL get better.
 The Trevor Project The Trevor Project is the leading national organization providing crisis intervention and suicide prevention services to lesbian, gay, bisexual, transgender, and questioning youth.
 Suicide Hotlines Directory

Journals of suicide intervention research:
 Archives of Suicide Research
 Crisis: The Journal of Crisis Intervention and Suicide Prevention

Counseling
Suicide prevention
Treatment of bipolar disorder